Janine Pietsch (born 30 June 1982 in Berlin) is a German backstroke swimmer.  In the course of her career, she competed at the 2004 Summer Olympics in Athens, won two gold medals on the short course at the 2006 FINA World Swimming Championships, and four European gold medals.

Career

2001–2005
Pietsch's first success on an international stage was at the 2001 European Short Course Swimming Championships in Antwerp, where she won one silver medal, in the 4x50m medley and three bronze medals, in the 50m backstroke, 100m backstroke, and 4x100m freestyle relay. She would win another silver and two more bronze medals the next year in 2002. Between 2003 and 2005 she would win a further five silvers and one bronze in three European short course championships. In 2004, she competed in her only Olympic race, the 100 m backstroke. She finished seventh in her heat, and 23rd overall.

2006–2007
2006 was the best year of her career. In April she competed in Shanghai at the 2006 FINA World Swimming Championships, where she won two gold medals, the 50m backstroke, and the 100m backstroke. She won both gold medals by exactly a quarter of a second over second place.

In Budapest at the long-course 2006 European Aquatics Championships in late Summer, she won a gold medal in the 50m backstroke, and a bronze in the 100m backstroke. That December in Helsinki at the 2006 short-course European championships, she won two more gold medals, the 50 m backstroke and 4x50m medley. In her last international success to date, at the 2007 short-course European championships she won gold in the 4x50m relay, silver in the 50m backstroke, and bronze in the 100m backstroke.

Semi-retirement and personal life
In 2008, Pietsch was diagnosed with breast cancer, and did not compete at the 2008 Summer Olympics as a result. However, she has not ruled out trying to qualify for the 2012 London Olympics. In 2010, she became a patron of the St. Mary's Hospital in Stuttgart.

See also
 World record progression 50 metres backstroke

References

1982 births
Living people
German female swimmers
Swimmers at the 2004 Summer Olympics
Olympic swimmers of Germany
Swimmers from Berlin
Female backstroke swimmers
World record setters in swimming
Medalists at the FINA World Swimming Championships (25 m)
European Aquatics Championships medalists in swimming
20th-century German women
21st-century German women